Western Maryland Railway No. 202 is a preserved 4-6-2 "pacific" steam locomotive built in 1912 by the Baldwin Locomotive Works for the Western Maryland Railway. The locomotive was used for pulling various passenger trains of the WM over the course of 40 years. In 1938, the locomotive was refitted with Walschaert valve gear, replacing its original Baker valve gear. In 1947, it was converted to burn oil and stayed east of Cumberland after the conversion. No. 202 pulled its last revenue freight assignment in 1952, and it was subsequently retired and donated "to the children of Hagerstown", to be displayed in City Park, Hagerstown, Maryland. It is one of only two surviving Western Maryland steam locomotives and the only surviving mainline WM steam locomotive.

In 1983, No. 202 was purchased by John Long, who started an effort to restore the locomotive to operating condition, but unfortunately passed away before it could be completed. After he died, ownership of No. 202 reverted to the City of Hagerstown. In the late 1980s, the line that ran between Cumberland and Frostburg was sold to the then-new Western Maryland Scenic Railroad (WMSR), who started looking for a steam locomotive to operate on their trackage. The WMSR initially wanted to restore No. 202, since it was an authentic Western Maryland locomotive. However, due to its low tractive effort and the city of Hagerstown choosing to retain ownership of the locomotive, restoration and subsequent operation of No. 202 on the WMSR never came to fruition, and it has since remained in the park under the auspices of the Hagerstown City Park Train Hub.

No. 202 spent so much time being exposed to the elements and vandals, that it was cosmetically restored in 2008 for a cleaner appearance. However, the locomotive is still remains in City Park, as of 2022.

No. 202 was listed on the National Register of Historic Places in 1984.

See also
 Hagerstown City Park

References

 Western Maryland 202 from www.steamlocomotive.info
 National Register of historic Places listings for Washington County, MD

External links

, including photo from 1982, at Maryland Historical Trust

Western Maryland Railway
4-6-2 locomotives
Baldwin locomotives
Rail transportation on the National Register of Historic Places in Maryland
Individual locomotives of the United States
Hagerstown
Railway locomotives on the National Register of Historic Places
Museums in Washington County, Maryland
Railroad museums in Maryland
National Register of Historic Places in Washington County, Maryland
Railway locomotives introduced in 1912
Standard gauge locomotives of the United States
Preserved steam locomotives of Maryland